Dare To Dream is the second studio album by the Serbian Irish folk/Celtic rock band Irish Stew of Sindidun, released on Saint Patrick's Day in 2008.

Having finished promoting their first album, the band started writing new material which was released in 2008. Dare To Dream featured ten original songs and cover versions of two traditional Irish folk songs. A promotional video was recorded for the song "Ditch" in March 2009.

The Celtic punk fan site shitenonions.com ranked the album the fifth best release of 2008.

Track listing 
Lyrics and music written by Bojan Petrović except where noted.
 "Blessed And Damned" – 03:45
 "Ditch" – 03:37
 "Life Without Living On A Sunny Winter Day" – 04:46
 "I Will Never (Be Your Friend)" – 05:06
 "Memories" – 04:00
 "Whiskey And Miles Behind" – 04:36
 "The Sailor's Song" (Nenad Gavrilov, Bojan Petrović) – 03:28
 "Pile Of Sins" – 03:40
 "Weila, Waila" (Traditional, arranged by Irish Stew of Sindidun) – 03:11
 "Carrickfergus" (Traditional, arranged by Irish Stew of Sindidun) – 04:29
 "Farewell" – 04:05
 "Sweet Long Stick" (Irish Stew of Sindidun) – 02:43

Personnel 
 Bojan Petrović – lead vocals, tin whistles
 Nenad Gavrilov – acoustic guitar, backing vocals
 Ivan Ðurić – banjo, electric guitar, backing vocals
 Ana Mrkobrada – violin
 Aleksandar Gospodinov – bass guitar, backing vocals
 Marko Krasnić – drums

References 

 Dare to Dream info on the band's official site

Irish Stew of Sindidun albums
2008 albums
One Records (Serbia) albums